Evarcha is a genus of spiders in the family Salticidae (jumping spiders) with 85 species (and one recognized subspecies) distributed across the world.

Habitat
These spiders are often found on shrubs and short plants in damp areas, resting in silken cells.

Description
Spiders in this genus generally look rather sturdy and are not very colorful, often brownish.

Evarcha culicivora can be an uncommon predator due to the fact it feeds on vertebrate blood by choosing blood-carrying mosquitoes as well-liked prey.

Distribution
Most species occur in Asia, Africa and parts of Europe, with E. amabilis and E. hoyi found only in the United States. E. proszynskii is found from Russia to Japan and Canada to United States.

Species

, the World Spider Catalog accepted the following species:

 Evarcha acuta Wesołowska, 2006 – Namibia
 Evarcha albaria (L. Koch, 1878) – Russia, China, Korea, Japan
 Evarcha amabilis (C. L. Koch, 1846) – United States
 Evarcha annae (Peckham & Peckham, 1903) – South Africa
 Evarcha aposto Wesołowska & Tomasiewicz, 2008 – Ethiopia
 Evarcha arabica Wesołowska & van Harten, 2007 – Yemen
 Evarcha arcuata (Clerck, 1757) – Palearctic
 Evarcha armeniaca Logunov, 1999 – Armenia, Azerbaijan
 Evarcha awashi Wesołowska & Tomasiewicz, 2008 – Ethiopia
 Evarcha bakorensis Rollard & Wesołowska, 2002 – Guinea
 Evarcha bicoronata (Simon, 1901) – Hong Kong
 Evarcha bihastata Wesołowska & Russell-Smith, 2000 – Tanzania
 Evarcha brinki Haddad & Wesołowska, 2011 – South Africa
 Evarcha bulbosa Zabka, 1985 – China, Vietnam
 Evarcha cancellata (Simon, 1902) – Sri Lanka, Java
 Evarcha carbonaria (Lessert, 1927) – Congo
 Evarcha certa Rollard & Wesołowska, 2002 – Guinea
 Evarcha chappuisi Lessert, 1925 – East Africa
 Evarcha chubbi Lessert, 1925 – East Africa
 Evarcha coreana Seo, 1988 – China, Korea
 Evarcha crinita Logunov & Zamanpoore, 2005 – Afghanistan
 Evarcha culicivora Wesołowska & Jackson, 2003 – Kenya
 Evarcha darinurica Logunov, 2001 – Afghanistan
 Evarcha dena Zamani, 2017 – Iran
 Evarcha denticulata Wesołowska & Haddad, 2013 – South Africa
 Evarcha digitata Peng & Li, 2002 – China
 Evarcha dubia (Kulczynski, 1901) – Ethiopia
 Evarcha falcata (Clerck, 1757) – Palearctic
 Evarcha fasciata Seo, 1992 – China, Korea, Japan
 Evarcha flagellaris Haddad & Wesołowska, 2011 – South Africa
 Evarcha flavocincta (C. L. Koch, 1846) – China to Java
 Evarcha gausapata (Thorell, 1890) – Sumatra, Java
 Evarcha grandis Wesołowska & A. Russell-Smith, 2011 – Nigeria
 Evarcha hoyi (Peckham & Peckham, 1883) – USA, Canada
 Evarcha hyllinella Strand, 1913 – Lombok
 Evarcha idanrensis Wesołowska & A. Russell-Smith, 2011 – Nigeria
 Evarcha ignea Wesołowska & Cumming, 2008 – Zimbabwe
 Evarcha improcera Wesołowska & van Harten, 2007 – Yemen
 Evarcha infrastriata (Keyserling, 1881) – Queensland
 Evarcha insularis (Metzner, 1999) – Greece, Turkey, Iraq, Iran
 Evarcha jucunda (Lucas, 1846) – Mediterranean, introduced in Belgium
 Evarcha karas Wesołowska, 2011 – Namibia
 Evarcha kirghisica Rakov, 1997 – Kyrgyzstan
 Evarcha kochi Simon, 1902 – Java, Lombok
 Evarcha laetabunda (C. L. Koch, 1846) – Palearctic
 Evarcha longula (Thorell, 1881) – New Guinea, Australia
 Evarcha maculata Rollard & Wesołowska, 2002 – Guinea
 Evarcha madagascariensis Prószynski, 1992 – Madagascar
 Evarcha michailovi Logunov, 1992 – France, Russia, Central Asia, China
 Evarcha mirabilis Wesołowska & Haddad, 2009 – South Africa
 Evarcha mongolica Danilov & Logunov, 1994 – Russia, China
 Evarcha negevensis Prószynski, 2000 – Israel
 Evarcha nenilini Rakov, 1997 – Central Asia
 Evarcha nepos (O. P-Cambridge, 1872) – Israel
 Evarcha nigricans (Dalmas, 1920) – Tunisia
 Evarcha nigrifrons (C. L. Koch, 1846) – Sumatra
 Evarcha obscura Caporiacco, 1947 – East Africa
 Evarcha optabilis (Fox, 1937) – China
 Evarcha orientalis (Song & Chai, 1992) – China
 Evarcha paralbaria Song & Chai, 1992 – China
 Evarcha patagiata (O. P.-Cambridge, 1872) – Syria
 Evarcha picta Wesołowska & van Harten, 2007 – Yemen
 Evarcha pileckii Prószynski, 2000 – Israel
 Evarcha pinguis Wesołowska & Tomasiewicz, 2008 – Ethiopia
 Evarcha pococki Zabka, 1985 – Bhutan to Vietnam, China
 Evarcha praeclara Prószynski & Wesołowska, 2003 – Sudan, Israel, Yemen
 Evarcha prosimilis Wesołowska & Cumming, 2008 – Tanzania, Zimbabwe
 Evarcha proszynskii Marusik & Logunov, 1998 – Russia to Japan, USA, Canada
 Evarcha pseudopococki Peng, Xie & Kim, 1993 – China
 Evarcha pulchella (Thorell, 1895) – Myanmar
 Evarcha reiskindi Berry, Beatty & Prószynski, 1996 – Caroline Islands
 Evarcha rotundibulbis Wesołowska & Tomasiewicz, 2008 – Ethiopia
 Evarcha russellsmithi Wesołowska & Tomasiewicz, 2008 – Ethiopia
 Evarcha selenaria Suguro & Yahata, 2012 – Japan
 Evarcha seyun Wesołowska & van Harten, 2007 – Yemen
 Evarcha similis Caporiacco, 1941 – Ethiopia
 Evarcha squamulata (Simon, 1902) – Sierra Leone
 Evarcha striolata Wesołowska & Haddad, 2009 – South Africa
 Evarcha syriaca Kulczynski, 1911 – Syria, Israel
 Evarcha vitosa Próchniewicz, 1989 – Central, East Africa
 Evarcha vittula Haddad & Wesołowska, 2011 – South Africa
 Evarcha werneri (Simon, 1906) (syn. Evarcha elegans) – Ethiopia, Sudan to Uganda, Tanzania, Namibia, South Africa
 Evarcha wulingensis Peng, Xie & Kim, 1993 – China
 Evarcha zimbabwensis Wesołowska & Cumming, 2008 – Zimbabwe

References

Further reading
 Fiona R. Cross, Robert R. Jackson & Simon D. Pollard (2008), "Complex display behaviour of Evarcha culicivora, an East African mosquito‐eating jumping spider", New Zealand Journal of Zoology, 35(2), 151–187,

External links

 Photograph of E. praeclara
 Photograph of E. cara
 Photograph of E. hoyi

Salticidae genera
Cosmopolitan spiders
Salticidae